Reyesano, or Chirigua (Chiriba), is a nearly extinct Tacanan language that was spoken by only a few speakers, including children, in 1961 in Bolivia. It is spoken by the Maropa people who number 4,505 in 2012.

There still are adult speakers in the largely indigenous community of El Cozar in Reyes. However, it is doubtful that this language will survive much into the 21st century. Such is the margination of the indigenous people in the Beni that very little Reyesano words have entered the popular criollo Spanish, very unlike the situation in Quechua and Aymara influenced areas. There are many indigenous terms in  "camba" (Spanish of the Beni) but they mostly of Guaraní origin carried to the Beni by the original settlers from Santa Cruz.

Evidently the name Reyesano comes from the name of the town of Reyes, of the Province of Ballivián in the Department of the Beni in the plains adjacent to the Bolivian Amazon. The language is also known as Sapiboca (Sapibocona), Maropa, Chumana, and perhaps Warisa (Guariza); these may have corresponded to different dialects.

References

External links
 Lenguas de Bolivia (online edition)

Languages of Bolivia
Endangered indigenous languages of the Americas